The Blue Danube (German: An der schönen blauen Donau) is a 1955 Austrian romantic comedy film directed by Hans Schweikart and starring Hardy Krüger, Nicole Besnard and Paul Hörbiger. It was shot at the Schönbrunn Studios in Vienna and on location around the city. The film's sets were designed by the art director Fritz Jüptner-Jonstorff.

Synopsis
A young king and a princess are engaged to be married but have never met. Both are reluctant to take part in an arranged marriage but they meet in Vienna and fall in love.

Cast
 Hardy Krüger as König Richard von Carpien
 Nicole Besnard as 	Prinzessin Gennie Brabanzini
 Paul Hörbiger as Kriminalkommissar Schröder
 Renée Saint-Cyr as 	Baronin Susanne Brabanzini
 Jean Wall as Premierminister Emser
 Susi Nicoletti as Gräfin Eichenfels
 Adrienne Gessner as 	Fürstin
 Egon von Jordan as Hofrat Rudi Haller
 Hubert von Meyerinck as Baron Philipp von und zu Weidendorf
 Rudolf Carl as Kriminalassistent Winkler
 Theodor Danegger as 	Chauffeur Jean
 Hans Unterkircher as 	Graf Eichenfels
 Ernst Waldbrunn as 	Kinobesitzer		
 Toni von Bukovics as Frau des Küfers
 Karl Ehmann as Karl, ein Küfer
 Martin Costa as 	Pächter
 Theodor Grieg as Huber, Photograph
 Carlo Böhm as 	Sohn des Küfers 
 Mimi Stelzer as 	Blumenfrau
 Franz Böheim as 	Heurigensänger
 Viktor Braun as Fiakerlenker
 Raoul Retzer as Exzellenz mit Fes

References

Bibliography 
 Fritsche, Maria. Homemade Men in Postwar Austrian Cinema: Nationhood, Genre and Masculinity. Berghahn Books, 2013.

External links 
 

1955 films
1955 comedy films
Austrian comedy films
1950s German-language films
Films directed by Hans Schweikart
Films shot at Schönbrunn Studios
Films shot in Vienna
Films set in Vienna
Austrian black-and-white films